This is a list of Somali Americans.

Fashion
Halima Aden, fashion model
Jawahir Ahmed, fashion model and beauty pageant winner
Iman, supermodel, actress and entrepreneur
Muna Khalif, fashion designer and legislator; MP in the Federal Parliament of Somalia
Ayaan and Idyl Mohallim, fashion designers; founders of Mataano
Fatima Siad, fashion model

Media
Abdisalam Aato, film director, producer, entrepreneur and media consultant; founder of Olol Films
Mona Kosar Abdi, multimedia journalist
Barkhad Abdi, actor, film director and producer
Fathia Absie, broadcaster, writer and filmmaker
Faysal Ahmed, actor
Said Salah Ahmed, playwright, poet, educator and filmmaker
Alisha Boe, actress
Idil Ibrahim, film director, producer and entrepreneur; founder of Zeila Films
Barni Ahmed Qaasim, multimedia artist and filmmaker
Abdirahman Yabarow, journalist

Society and politics
Asha Ahmed Abdalla, politician; member of the Transitional Federal Parliament
Raqiya Haji Dualeh Abdalla, sociologist and politician; President of the Somali Family Care Network
Hussein Sheikh Abdirahman, politician and judge; former Minister of Defence of Somalia
Ayaan Hirsi Ali, writer, political activist, former legislator
Abukar Arman, political analyst, writer and diplomat; former Special Envoy of Somalia to the U.S.
Abdirizak Bihi, social activist
Nimco Ahmed, political activist
Anisa Hajimumin, politician, social activist and writer; Minister of Women & Family Affairs of Puntland
Kayse Jama, member of the Oregon State Senate
Fatima Jibrell, environmental activist; co-founder of Adeso
Ahmed M. Hassan, entrepreneur and politician; member of the Clarkston City Council
Hodan Hassan, member of the Minnesota House of Representatives
Ismail Ali Ismail, writer and former diplomat
Hassan Ali Mire, politician; former Minister of Education of Somalia
Abdinur Sheikh Mohamed, educator and politician; former Minister of Education of Somalia
Mohamed Abdullahi Mohamed, diplomat, professor and politician; current President of Somalia
Mohamud Noor, member of the Minnesota House of Representatives
Ilhan Omar, legislator with the Democratic–Farmer–Labor Party
Mohamed Abshir Waldo, journalist, activist, and former politician
Abdi Warsame, politician; member of the Minneapolis City Council

Science
Ali Said Faqi, scientist
Anisa Ibrahim, medical doctor
Sahra Noor, social activist and entrepreneur; Chief Executive Officer of People's Center Health Services
Musse Olol, engineer and social activist; Chairman of the Somali American Council of Oregon

Sport
Bilqis Abdul-Qaadir, basketball player  
Hassan Mead, cross country and track and field athlete 
Omar Mohamed, professional footballer for FC Cincinnati in the USL

Finance
Yussur A.F. Abrar, economist and entrepreneur; former Governor of the Central Bank of Somalia
Hussein Samatar, banker and community organizer
Abdiweli Mohamed Ali, economist and politician; President of Puntland
Abdirahman Duale Beyle, economist; former Minister of Foreign Affairs of Somalia
Said Sheikh Samatar, scholar, historian and writer
Abdisalam Omer, economist; Minister of Foreign Affairs of Somalia

Creative
Ali Jimale Ahmed, scholar, poet and writer
Nuruddin Farah, writer
Ladan Osman, poet and teacher
Ahmed Ismail Samatar, professor, politician and writer
Sofia Samatar, professor, editor and writer
Saado Ali Warsame, singer-songwriter and politician

Military
Asli Hassan Abade, military pilot

See also
List of Somalis

 
Somali American
Somali Americans
American
Somali